Mount Bell is a bluff-type mountain, 4,305 m, forming a part of the northeast edge of Grindley Plateau, 6 nautical miles (11 km) southeast of Mount Mackellar in Queen Alexandra Range, Antarctica. Named by the British Antarctic Expedition (1907–09) after William Bell, a relative of Shackleton and supporter of the expedition.

Mountains of the Ross Dependency
Shackleton Coast
Four-thousanders of Antarctica